Knucklas (meaning "green hillock") is a village in Powys, Wales, previously Radnorshire. It lies in the upper valley of the River Teme, just off the B4355 road and is served by Knucklas railway station on the Heart of Wales Line.

Notable landmarks

The Castle Mound
A protected ancient monument in the care of Knucklas Castle Community Land Project and listed by Cadw, it is the site of a castle believed to have been built by the Mortimers in about 1220–25. It consisted of a square stone keep with four round towers, sited on top of a steep hill. There is some evidence that there may have been further outer walls. It was captured by a Welsh army in 1262, which destroyed the defences.

Below the castle lies the battlefield of the Battle of Beguildy thought to have been fought between the Welsh and the Mortimer family of Norman Marcher Lords in 1146. The castle was attacked and destroyed by the forces of Owain Glyndŵr in 1402 during his rebellion. Whilst there is a romantic story associating the castle location with the marriage of Guinevere and King Arthur, this probably developed from an earlier story, which suggested that a marriage took place between Gwenhwyfar, the daughter of Ogrfan Gawr (also called 'Gogrfan Gawr "the Giant" of Castell y Cnwclas' – Knucklas Castle), and Arthur the warrior – there being no reference to Arthur as a king in the early Welsh texts.

The Viaduct
The spectacular 13-arch span was completed by the Central Wales Railway in 1865 and recorded in an engraving from the Illustrated London News.

Heyope
Three Bronze Age torcs were found here and declared treasure in 1991. They are now housed in the National Museum, Cardiff.

The parish church of St David was built in 1882, on the site of a medieval church. The font dates from the 15th century.

The longest-burning tyre fire in British history occurred in Heyope, lasting 13 years from 1989 to 2001.

Further reading
Noble, F. (1955): "The Bronze Age gold torcs from Heyope". Transactions of the Radnorshire Society, 25, pp. 34–38.

Notable people 
 Vavasor Powell (1617–1670), Nonconformist Puritan preacher, evangelist, church leader and writer, who was imprisoned for his role in a plot to depose King Charles II.
 Malcolm Page (born 1947), former footballer with 350 club caps and 28 for Wales

References

External links
Useful Archaeological Records
Photos of Knucklas and surrounding area on geograph.org.uk
Photo of Arriva Trains Wales Class 153 Passing over Knucklas Viaduct

Video of Knucklas castle
Video of Knucklas viaduct

Villages in Powys